Trinity Primary Academy is a primary school in Bounds Green Road, Wood Green, London. It is a grade II listed building with Historic England. It is part of the Academies Enterprise Trust.

References

External links

Wood Green
Grade II listed buildings in the London Borough of Haringey
Primary schools in the London Borough of Haringey
Bounds Green Road
Academies in the London Borough of Haringey
Academies Enterprise Trust